Galich may refer to: 
Alexander Ivanovich Galich (1783–1848), Russian philosopher and Latin scholar
Alexander Galich (writer) (1918–1977), Russian dissident bard
Galich, Russia, a town in Kostroma Oblast, Russia
Galich, alternative spelling of Halych, a town in Ivano-Frankivsk Oblast, Ukraine

See also
Kingdom of Galicia–Volhynia, a large Ruthenian Duchy which existed in the 13th and 14th centuries
Kingdom of Galicia and Lodomeria, a subdivision of the Austrian Empire from 1772 to 1918
Galicia (Eastern Europe), a historical region in East Central Europe, currently divided between Poland and Ukraine
Galicia (Spain)
Galicia (disambiguation), terms related to Galicia